The Art of Racing in the Rain is a 2019 American comedy-drama film directed by Simon Curtis and written by Mark Bomback, based on the 2008 novel of the same name by author Garth Stein. The film stars Milo Ventimiglia, Amanda Seyfried, Kevin Costner as the voice of Enzo and Parker as Enzo, the golden retriever.

It was theatrically released on August 9, 2019 by 20th Century Fox. The film received mixed reviews from critics and grossed over $33 million worldwide.

Plot
In Seattle, Enzo (named after Enzo Ferrari) is dying. The old Golden Retriever is waiting for Denny, his master and best friend, to return. When Denny finds Enzo unable to move, the dog begins to narrate his life.

Years prior, Denny buys a puppy, immediately bonding with young Enzo. Denny divides his time between teaching auto racing and caring for Enzo, while also pursuing a career as a race driver. A year later, Denny meets Eve at the supermarket and they begin to date.

After Denny and Eve marry the following year, Eve's mother, Trish, is supportive, but her father, Maxwell, doesn't fully approve of Denny due to his career as a race driver. Eve becomes pregnant. On Christmas Day, Denny receives an invitation to drive in the 24 Hours of Daytona in February, which unfortunately takes place close to Eve's due date. She gives birth to daughter Zoë at home with 2 midwives, while the TV in the adjacent room shows Denny racing in Florida, thus missing the birth.

A few years pass and family life is idyllic for Enzo, while Denny spends prolonged periods away from home to race. Eve begins to fall seriously ill and Enzo can smell a ‘rotting wood’ odor coming from her head. She is diagnosed with brain cancer, with she and Zoë living with her parents during her treatment. Resigned to her fate, Eve admits to Enzo that she is no longer afraid of death and passes away while he watches on.

Maxwell blames Denny's absence for Eve's illness, so demands custody of Zoë, threatening to sue if Denny does not comply. Furious at Maxwell's revelation of his absence over Zoë's birth, Denny attempts to leave but is grabbed by Maxwell, who falls and breaks a rib in the scuffle. Maxwell reports the incident to the police and Denny is arrested for 4th-degree assault. If he loses the case, Denny faces a 3-month jail sentence plus his in-laws taking permanent custody of his daughter.

Denny continues to race and is offered a job in Maranello testing prototypes for Ferrari, which he has to decline due to his case; he promises that if his case turns out in his favor, he will accept the offer.

A frustrated Denny goes jogging in the rain with Enzo. Struggling to keep pace in his old age, Enzo attempts to follow Denny across a street but is hit by a car. Denny rushes him to an animal hospital where the vet explains that Enzo is lucky to be alive and may suffer from hip dysplasia in the near future.

Exhausted of money and patience, Denny agrees to an out-of-court settlement, giving up custody of Zoë in exchange for visitation and the dropping of the assault charge. However, Enzo grabs the legal document, runs outside and rips it to shreds, convincing Denny to keep fighting. The trial begins and Trish, feeling guilty, admits the truth about the incident while under oath; the charges are dropped, Denny calls the Ferrari representative and takes the job.

When Maxwell and Trish show up at Zoë's ninth birthday party, Denny is very forgiving, wanting them both in Zoë's life.

Over the next few weeks, Enzo's health rapidly deteriorates. Realizing that the end is near, Denny arranges to drive him around the track where he used to teach. Enzo laments that he will not be able to travel to Italy or care for his family but insists that he has enjoyed a good life. He recalls a television documentary which showcased Mongolian beliefs that after dogs die, some are reincarnated as a human. Enzo explains that he is looking forward to his new life.

Eight years later, Denny, now a successful Formula One driver for Scuderia Ferrari, is living in Italy with Zoë. Denny is introduced to a young fan with golden hair who asks for an autograph. He agrees, discovering the boy's name is Enzo. Denny smiles and tells the father that the boy reminds him of an old friend and tells him to bring the boy to him when his father thinks he is ready to race.

Cast 

In addition, in the final scene, Lily Dodsworth-Evans has a brief appearance as a 17-year-old Zoë and former Scuderia Ferrari Formula One driver Giancarlo Fisichella is standing in the Ferrari garage.

Production 
In July 2009, Universal Pictures bought the film rights to the prize-winning novel The Art of Racing in the Rain.  The project was not able to find a director and came to a halt with Universal Studios. Walt Disney Studios acquired the rights in January 2016. The film adaptation was to be produced by Neal H. Moritz through his Original Film production company.

In 2017, screenwriter Mark Bomback revealed that the project was now set up at 20th Century Fox, saying, "I'm hoping the third time's the charm, and I'm optimistic that next year will be when it finally goes into production."

Principal photography on the film began on May 9, 2018, in Vancouver, British Columbia. The auto racing scenes were filmed at Canadian Tire Motorsport Park in Bowmanville, Ontario, with additional on-track scenes filmed at Laguna Seca Raceway near Monterey, California, Pacific Raceways near Kent, Washington, and Mission Raceway Park, 80 km (50 mi) southeast of Vancouver.

Dustin O'Halloran & Volker Bertelmann teamed up to compose the film score. Fox Music & Hollywood Records has released the soundtrack.

Release
The film was released on August 9, 2019, by Walt Disney Studios Motion Pictures.

Home media
The Art of Racing in the Rain was released on Digital HD by 20th Century Fox Home Entertainment on October 29, 2019, and on DVD and Blu-ray on November 5, 2019. It was added to Disney+ on September 16, 2022.

Reception

Box office 
The Art of Racing in the Rain grossed $26.4 million in the United States and Canada, and $7.4 million in other territories, for a worldwide total of $33.8 million.

In the United States and Canada, the film was released alongside The Kitchen, Dora and the Lost City of Gold, Scary Stories to Tell in the Dark and Brian Banks, and was projected to gross $6–8 million from 2,700 theaters in its opening weekend. The film made $3 million on its first day, including $450,000 from Thursday night previews. It ended up debuting to $8.1 million, finishing sixth at the box office. It dropped 46% in its second weekend to $4.4 million, finishing in 10th.

Critical response
The site's critical consensus reads: "Its heartstring-tugging overtures may be difficult for dog lovers to resist, but The Art of Racing in the Rain is sentimental and contrived." On Metacritic the film has a weighted average score of 43 out of 100, based on 31 critics, indicating "mixed or average reviews". Audiences polled by CinemaScore gave the film an average grade of "A−" on an A+ to F scale, while those at PostTrak gave it an average 4.5 out of 5 stars and a 72% "definite recommend".

Ed Potton of The Sunday Times gave the film a positive review, observing that the premise "really shouldn't work, yet somehow it steers a course between corniness and barminess. By the end I was crying like a baby, along with many of the other people in my screening, as well as giggling at the preposterousness of it all." Peter Debruge of Variety wrote: "Granted, there aren't a lot of surprises in The Art of Racing in the Rain. If anything, knowing — or at least anticipating — how the film's myriad tragedies will unfold seems to heighten the effect."

Charlotte O'Sullivan of the Evening Standard gave the film 2 out of 5 stars, calling it "strong contender for most ridiculous tearjerker of the year," while Adam Graham of The Detroit News gave the film a "C" on an A to F scale, noting that "this tale of friendship and companionship between man and man's best friend is bogged down in weepy cliches ripped straight from the Art of Making the Audience Cry handbook."

References

External links 
 
 

2019 films
2019 comedy-drama films
20th Century Fox films
American auto racing films
American comedy-drama films
Films about dogs
Films about pets
Films about reincarnation
Films about father–daughter relationships
Films based on American novels
Films directed by Simon Curtis
Films produced by Neal H. Moritz
Films scored by Dustin O'Halloran
Films set in Seattle
Films shot in Ontario
Films shot in Vancouver
Films with screenplays by Mark Bomback
Original Film films
2010s English-language films
2010s American films